Harlem Bush Music is a compilation of two albums by saxophonist Gary Bartz NTU Troop, recorded in 1970 and 1971 and released on the Milestone label.

Reception

Ronnie D. Lankford, Jr. of AllMusic wrote: "How one finally looks at Harlem Bush Music -- is it music, politics, or something in between -- matters less than understanding the time and place that it was made. And whether one ultimately finds these efforts by the Gary Bartz Ntu Troop satisfying or tiring matters less than appreciating the adventurous spirit that went into making them". All About Jazz stated: "Harlem Bush Music remains extremely relevant. Though the album came at a time when Black Consciousness and Black Pride were coming to the fore of American culture, current times are such that its message of struggle, love and hope transcends racial categories. That is both a great testament to the power of this music, as well as to the dawning fact in this country that we're all in this together".

Track listing 
All compositions by Gary Bartz except as indicated
 "Rise" - 5:28
 "People Dance" - 10:35
 "Du (Rain)"  - 4:17
 "Drinking Song" (Gary Bartz, Maxine Bartz) - 5:17
 "Taifa" (Gary Bartz, Maxine Bartz) - 4:21
 "Parted" (Paul Laurence Dunbar) - 2:04
 "The Warriors' Song" - 6:09 
 "Blue (A Folk Tale)" - 18:05
 "Uhuru Sasa" - 6:48
 "Vietcong" (Hakim Jami) - 5:16
 "Celestial Blues" (Andy Bey) - 7:34 
 "The Planets" - 5:08
Originally released as Harlem Bush Music: Taifa on Milestone 9031 (tracks 1-7) and Harlem Bush Music: Uhuru on Milestone 9032 (tracks 8-12).

Personnel 
Gary Bartz - alto saxophone, soprano saxophone, vocals, narration, piano
Andy Bey - vocals (tracks 1-5)
Juni Booth (tracks 1-7 & 10), Ron Carter (tracks 8, 9, 11 & 12) - bass, electric bass
Harold White - drums
Nat Bettis - percussion

References 

Gary Bartz albums
1997 albums
Jazz-funk albums
Milestone Records albums
Albums produced by Orrin Keepnews